Cypress is a front end testing tool for web applications. Cypress runs on Windows, Linux, and macOS. Cypress app is open-source software released under the MIT License while the Cypress Cloud is a web application. Cypress has been compared to Selenium.

History

Components

Cypress Recorder

Cypress E2E Testing

Cypress Component Test

See also

 Test automation
 Software testing
 Given-When-Then
 List of web testing tools
 Regression testing

References

External links

Graphical user interface testing